The Diodorinae, common name keyhole limpets and slit limpets, is a taxonomic subfamily of limpet-like sea snails, marine gastropod molluscs in the family Fissurellidae, the keyhole limpets and slit limpets.

Genera
 Cosmetalepas Iredale, 1924
 Diodora Gray, 1821
 Fissurellidea d'Orbigny, 1839
 Lucapina Gray in G. B. Sowerby I, 1835
 Megathura Pilsbry, 1890
 Monodilepas Finlay, 1926
Genera brought into synonymy
 Austroglyphis Cotton & Godfrey, 1934: synonym of Diodora Gray, 1821
 Capiluna Gray, 1857: synonym of Diodora Gray, 1821
 Elegidion Iredale, 1924: synonym of Diodora Gray, 1821
 Fissurellidaea: synonym of Fissurellidea d'Orbigny, 1839 (misspelling of genus)
 Fissuridea Swainson, 1840: synonym of Diodora Gray, 1821
 Foraminella G. B. Sowerby I, 1835: synonym of Lucapina Gray in G. B. Sowerby I, 1835 (Not available: introduced in synonymy; placed in synonymy of Lucapina by First Reviser's choice by Thiele, 1929)
 Glyphis Carpenter, 1857: synonym ofDiodora Gray, 1821 (invalid: junior homonym of Glyphis Agassiz, 1843)
 Megatebennus Pilsbry, 1890: synonym of Fissurellidea d'Orbigny, 1839

References

 Odhner N.H. (1932). Zur Morphologie und Systematik der Fissurelliden. Jenaische Zeitschrift für Naturwissenschaft. 67: 292-309, pl. 5
 Bouchet P., Rocroi J.P., Hausdorf B., Kaim A., Kano Y., Nützel A., Parkhaev P., Schrödl M. & Strong E.E. (2017). Revised classification, nomenclator and typification of gastropod and monoplacophoran families. Malacologia. 61(1-2): 1-526.
 Aktipis S.W., Boehm E. & Giribet G. (2011) Another step towards understanding the slit-limpets (Fissurellidae, Fissurelloidea, Vetigastropoda, Gastropoda): a combined five-gene molecular phylogeny. Zoologica Scripta 40: 238-259

External links
 

Fissurellidae